Fred Catero (February 4, 1933 – October 6, 2022) was an American record producer and engineer. Catero was originally from New York City, where he worked for CBS Records/Columbia, recording artists such as Chicago and Blood, Sweat & Tears. Invited by producer Roy Halee, Catero moved in the 1960s to San Francisco to work for Columbia Records there.  In San Francisco, Catero worked on albums by Bob Dylan, Al Kooper, Tower of Power and Santana, many of these under producer David Rubinson at the Automatt. He also produced and engineered recordings with Aaron Copland, Janis Joplin, Linda Ronstadt and Mel Tormé. In the 1980s he started an independent label Catero Records to focus on jazz artists. Artists on Catero Records included Laurie Antonioli and Paul Speer. In the mid-1980s, Catero was credited for getting new-age music accepted as a category of the Grammy Awards.

References

External links
Fred Catero Interview NAMM Oral History Library (2017)
The Music History Project, Podcast Episode 54 - Fred Catero NAMM The Music History Project (2019)

1933 births
2022 deaths
American audio engineers
Record producers from New York (state)
Engineers from New York City